Zdravko Čakalić (born 16 August 1960) is a retired footballer.

Playing career

Club career
Čakalić played with Red Star Belgrade, FK Teteks, FK Zemun and NK Osijek.

International career
He was part of the Yugoslav U20 team at the 1979 FIFA World Youth Championship.

References

External links
 Zdravko Čakalić at playmakerstats.com (English version of ceroacero.es)

1960 births
Living people
Footballers from Osijek
Association football midfielders
Yugoslav footballers
Red Star Belgrade footballers
FK Teteks players
FK Zemun players
NK Osijek players
Offenburger FV players
Yugoslav First League players
Oberliga (football) players
Yugoslav expatriate footballers
Expatriate footballers in West Germany
Yugoslav expatriate sportspeople in West Germany
Expatriate footballers in Germany
Yugoslav expatriate sportspeople in Germany